Gymnoscelis grisea is a moth in the family Geometridae. It is found on Fergusson Island.

References

Moths described in 1897
Gymnoscelis